The 2019 Rostelecom Cup was the fifth event of the 2019–20 ISU Grand Prix of Figure Skating, a senior-level international invitational competition series. It was held at Megasport Sport Palace in Moscow, Russia from November 15–17. Medals were awarded in the disciplines of men's singles, ladies' singles, pair skating, and ice dance. Skaters earned points toward qualifying for the 2019–20 Grand Prix Final.

Entries
The ISU announced the preliminary assignments on June 20, 2019.

Changes to preliminary assignments

Results

Men

Ladies

Pairs

Ice dance

References

Rostelecom Cup
2019 in figure skating
2019 in Russian sport
Rostelecom Cup